Sholpan Kozhakhmetova (born 23 April 1991 in Taldykorgan) is a Kazakhstani race walker. She competed in the 20 km kilometres event at the 2012 Summer Olympics.  Her twin sister, Ayman, competed in the same event at the 2012 Olympics.

References

1991 births
Living people
People from Taldykorgan
Kazakhstani female racewalkers
Olympic athletes of Kazakhstan
Athletes (track and field) at the 2012 Summer Olympics
World Athletics Championships athletes for Kazakhstan

Twin people